The Argentine horned frog (Ceratophrys ornata), also known as the Argentine wide-mouthed frog, ornate horned frog, ornate horned toad, or the ornate pacman frog, is a species of frog in the family Ceratophryidae. The species is endemic to South America. It is the most common species of horned frog, in the grasslands of Argentina, Uruguay and Brazil. A voracious eater, it will attempt to swallow anything that moves close to its wide mouth, such as insects, rodents, lizards, and other frogs, even if this predator would suffocate in the process. It is also kept as an exotic pet. The nickname "pacman frog" is a reference to the popular 1980's arcade game Pac-Man, where Pac-Man himself eats quite a lot, and has a mouth that takes up most of its body, much like the Argentine horned frog.

Description
The females of C. ornata can grow to be 16.5 centimeters (6.5 inches) snout to vent (SV) and the males 11.5 centimeters (4.5 in) SV. The average lifespan is 6 to 7 years, however they can live up to 10 years or more in captivity.
A horned frog's most prominent feature is its mouth, which accounts for roughly half of the animal's overall size.  Coloration is typically bright green with red markings, though dark green, parti-color black and albino versions also exist. 
Sexing this species is very difficult before sexual maturity is reached. Dimorphism traits between the two sexes are size difference and males possessing dark pigmented throats and nuptial pads on the forelimbs.

Feeding
All horned frogs, species of the genus Ceratophrys, hunt by remaining motionless, and waiting for prey. They will try to eat anything that can fit in their mouths, and some things that can't. In the wild, their typical diet would include rodents such as mice, small reptiles, as well as large spiders, and insects such as locusts.

Horned frogs are well known for their fearless reputation. They will attempt to consume animals, sometimes even the size of themselves. If threatened by a larger animal such as a human, these frogs can deliver a painful bite as they have several odontoid projections (not teeth per se) along their bottom and top jaws. Sometimes they will even jump towards their attacker, no matter their size and power. However, in captivity these frogs' natural diet is fairly easy to recreate. When kept as a pet, the horned frogs are usually fed mainly on large adult locusts, black and brown crickets, and mice; they also enjoy – depending on size – live fish. However, studies have proven primarily feeding a horned frog mice causes fat build-up, which often results in blindness and death.

Reproduction
Argentine horned frogs reproduce sexually. The Argentine horned frog's females deposit about 2,000 eggs in water and within two weeks they become tadpoles.

Gallery

References

Further reading
Bell T (1843). The Zoology of the Voyage of H.M.S. Beagle, under the Command of Captain FitzRoy, R.N., during the Years 1832 to 1836. Part V. Reptiles. London: Smith, Elder and Co. vi + 51 pp. + Plates I-XX. (Uperodon ornatum, new species, pp. 50–51 + Plate XX, figure 6). (in English and Latin).
Boulenger GA (1882). Catalogue of the Batrachia Salientia s. Ecaudata in the Collection of the British Museum. Second Edition. London: Trustees of the British Museum. (Taylor and Francis, printers). xvi + 503 pp. + Plates I-XXX. (Ceratophrys ornata, pp. 225–226).
Günther A (1858). Catalogue of the Batrachia Salientia in the Collection of the British Museum. London: Trustees of the British Museum. (Taylor and Francis, printers). xvi + 160 pp. + Plates I-XII. (Ceratophrys ornata, pp. 25–26).
Kobasa, Paul A., editor-in-chief (2006). "Argentine horned frog." The World Book Encyclopedia, Volume 1. Chicago: World Book, Inc. (p. 275).
De Vosjoli, Philippe (1990). The General Care and Maintenance of Horned Frogs. Mission Viejo, California: Advanced Vivarium Systems. 32 pp. .
Mattison, Chris (1987). Frogs and Toads of the World.  New York: Facts on File. 191 pp. .

Ceratophrys
Amphibians of Argentina
Amphibians of Brazil
Amphibians of Uruguay
Amphibians described in 1843
Taxa named by Thomas Bell (zoologist)